Helen Epstein is an American writer of memoir, journalism and biography who lives in Lexington, Massachusetts, United States.

Biography

Early life and education
Helen Epstein is the daughter of Kurt Epstein and Franci Rabinek, both survivors of Nazi concentration camps. She was born in Prague in November 27, 1947, grew up in New York City, and graduated from Hunter College High School, Hebrew University, and the Columbia Graduate School of Journalism.

Career
She became a journalist at the age of 20, while caught in the Soviet Invasion of Czechoslovakia. Her account was published in the Jerusalem Post and she has been a journalist ever since. Her articles and reviews have appeared in many major American publications and include profiles of art historian Meyer Schapiro and musicians Vladimir Horowitz and Leonard Bernstein.

Helen Epstein is the author, co-author, translator or editor of ten books of narrative non-fiction including the non-fiction trilogy Children of the Holocaust, Where She Came From: A Daughter’s Search for Her Mother’s History and The Long Half-Lives of Love and Trauma; and Joe Papp: An American Lifethe biography of a theater producer . She translated Heda Kovaly’s Under a Cruel Star, Paul Ornstein’s Looking Back: Memoir of a Psychoanalyst, and the tribute anthology Archivist on a Bicycle . The Long Half-Lives of Love and Traumawas published in English and Czech in 2018. In 2020, she published her late mother's memoir as Franci's War and in 2022, her cancer memoir Getting Through It.

She was the first tenured woman journalism professor in New York University (1981) and taught about 1000 students over 12 years. She guest lectures extensively at universities, libraries and religious institutions in North America and abroad.

Works
Children of the Holocaust. Penguin Books. 
 Music Talks. McGraw-Hill. 
 Where She Came from: A Daughter's Search for Her Mother's History. Little Brown & Co. 
 The Companies She Keeps. Plunkett Lake Press. 
 Joe Papp. Da Capo Press. 
 Écrire la vie. La Cause des Livres. 
 Un athlète juif dans la tourmente. La Cause des Livres. 
 Under a Cruel Star. Holmes & Meier Publishers. 
 Acting in Terezín. Plunkett Lake Press.
 Looking Back: Memoir of a Psychoanalyst. Plunkett Lake Press. 
 Archivist on a Bicycle. Plunkett Lake Press.
 Franci's War. Penguin 
 Getting Through It: My Year of Cancer during Covid Plunkett Lake Press

References

External links

1947 births
American biographers
American memoirists
American women journalists
Columbia University Graduate School of Journalism alumni
Czechoslovak emigrants to the United States
Hebrew University of Jerusalem alumni
Hunter College High School alumni
Living people
New York University faculty
American women biographers
American women memoirists
Writers from Massachusetts
Writers from New York City
Writers from Prague
American women academics
21st-century American women